Caracol, or El Caracol, from the Spanish term for "spiral (snail–, conch– seashell–) shaped", may refer to:

People
Manolo Caracol, a Spanish flamenco singer
Caracol, stage name of Quebec singer Carole Facal

Places
Caracol, an archaeological site and major centre of the pre-Columbian Maya civilization, located in present-day Belize
Caracol, Nord-Est, a commune in Haiti
Caracol, Añasco, Puerto Rico, a barrio

Brazil
Caracol, Mato Grosso do Sul
Caracol, Piauí
Caracol Falls, in Brazil
Caracol State Park, in Brazil, which contains the Caracol Falls

Mexico
El Caracol, Chichen Itza, a notable structure/observatory at the Maya archaeological site of Chichen Itza, northern Yucatán, Mexico
El Caracol, Ecatepec, a solar evaporation formation just outside Mexico City
El Caracol, Michoacán, a village in the municipality of Hidalgo, Michoacán state, Mexico
Caracol of Punta Sur, a Mayan site on Cozumel, Mexico

Media
Caracol Radio, a radio network in Colombia
Caracol TV, a television network in Colombia
Caracol TV Internacional, an international television channel from Colombia

See also
Caracol River (disambiguation)
Karakol (disambiguation)
Caracole, a military manoeuvre
Karakul (disambiguation)